Where Fortune Smiles is a free jazz LP credited to John McLaughlin, John Surman, Dave Holland, Karl Berger, and Stu Martin on Dawn Records DNLS ASD 3018, which was recorded in 1970 and released in 1971 in a stereo format.

Track listing 
"Glancing Backwards (for Junior)" – 8:54 - (John Surman)
"Earth Bound Hearts" – 4:15 - (John McLaughlin)
"Where Fortune Smiles" – 4:01 - (Surman)
"New Place, Old Place" – 10:24 - (McLaughlin)
"Hope" – 7:19 - (McLaughlin)

Personnel
John McLaughlin – guitars
John Surman – soprano saxophone, baritone saxophone, bass clarinet
Dave Holland  – upright bass
Karl Berger – vibraphone
Stu Martin – drums
Dave Baker – engineer

Critical reception

Jazz critic Scott Yanow wrote: “McLaughlin's raw sound was starting to take shape by this time and his impeccable chops are on full display. So too are those of the underrated vibraphonist Karl Berger and, of course, soprano saxophonist Surman. The foundation is held loosely in place by bassist Dave Holland and drummer Stu Martin. It's a challenging but interesting listen, especially given McLaughlin's later success and popularity.” Robert Christgau stated "Recorded in New York in 1969, when McLaughlin's studio appearances were amazing everyone from Jimi to Buddy to Miles, this prefigures Mahavishnu's fusion at an earlier, jazzier stage. Pretty intense. The rock guy (drummer Martin) sounds a lot more original than the jazz guys (keyboard player Berger and--especially--saxophonist Surman), but only the justifiably ubiquitous Holland (on bass) can keep up with McLaughlin. And believe me, even if in historical fact it's McLaughlin who's trying to keep up, that's how it sounds."

Background
As released in 1971 on Dawn records, and a subsequent 1975 release on Pye, the album was credited to all participating musicians, with no one receiving top billing.   With the reissue on CD in 1993, the album was retroactively credited to McLaughlin alone, a move suggested to have been for "marketing purposes only". Composition credits and solo times are shared more or less equally between McLaughlin and Surman, and McLaughlin is not understood to have acted in a leadership capacity for the sessions.

A one-off studio record between 5 accomplished musicians who never recorded as a group subsequently, the two studio efforts necessary to complete the album were fit in between and/or after: John Surman working with Barre Phillips and Stu Martin in “The Trio” (Dawn LP – DNLS 3006),  John McLaughlin working with Miles Davis,  Karl touring with Don Cherry in Europe, and Dave also working with Miles.

Reissues
Where Fortune Smiles was reissued on vinyl in 1975 by Pye Records (Pye 12103) with an alternative cover.  It was first reissued on CD in 1993 on One Way Records (OW 29312),  then on a re-mastered promo on BGO Records in 1993 – and officially in 1996 (BGO 191). The entire album is included on the 3-CD set John Surman: Glancing Backwards, the Dawn anthology.

External links

References

John McLaughlin (musician) albums
1971 albums
Jazz fusion albums
Dawn Records albums
John Surman albums
Dave Holland albums
Karl Berger albums
Stu Martin (drummer) albums
Collaborative albums
Pye Records albums
One Way Records albums